Marko Cavka (born April 8, 1981) is a former professional American football offensive tackle. He was drafted by the New York Jets in the sixth round of the 2004 NFL Draft. He played college football at Sacramento State.

Early years
Cavka attended Cypress High School in Cypress, California and was a student and a letterman in football and volleyball. In football, he was a three-year letterman, and as a senior, he was named the Empire League Lineman of the Year, was selected as All-California Interscholastic Federation defensive lineman, and was an All-Orange County selection. Marko Cavka graduated from Cypress High School in 1999.

College career
Cavka attended California State University, Sacramento and was a student and a football letterman. In football, he started 42 consecutive games as an offensive lineman.

In 2010, Cavka was elected to the 2000–2010 CSU Sacramento Hornets Football All-Decade Team.

Professional career
Cavka was selected by the New York Jets in the sixth round (178th overall) of the 2004 NFL Draft.

Cavka played with the Amsterdam Admirals in NFL Europe in 2006 & 2007.

The New York Jets announced that they signed Marko Cavka to a contract on July 24, 2007 but was released on September 2 after sustaining an injury in the 5th preseason game.

References

1981 births
Living people
People from Cypress, California
American football offensive tackles
Sacramento State Hornets football players
Sportspeople from Orange County, California
New York Jets players
Amsterdam Admirals players
Hamilton Tiger-Cats players
Players of American football from California